|}

The Sharp Novices' Hurdle is a Grade 2 National Hunt hurdle race in Great Britain which is open to horses aged four years or older. It is run on the Old Course at Cheltenham over a distance of about 2 miles and half a furlong (2 miles and 87 yards, or ), and during its running there are eight hurdles to be jumped. The race is for novice hurdlers, and it is scheduled to take place each year in November.

The event was formerly contested over 2 miles, and it used to be held in December. It was extended by a furlong in 1992, and it was cut to its present length and moved to November in 1994. In 2011 the race was renamed as the Opus Energy Novices' Hurdle as part of a sponsorship deal with UK power supplier Opus Energy. Since 2013 the race has been sponsored by Sky Bet and run as the Sky Bet Supreme Trial Novices' Hurdle.

Winners since 1987

See also
 Horse racing in Great Britain
 List of British National Hunt races

References

 Racing Post:
 pedigreequery.com – Sharp Novices' Hurdle – Cheltenham.

National Hunt races in Great Britain
Cheltenham Racecourse
National Hunt hurdle races